Nicola Geuer and Anna Zaja were the defending champions, but Zaja chose not to participate. Geuer played alongside Cornelia Lister, but lost in the semifinals to Ysaline Bonaventure and Bibiane Schoofs.

Bonaventure and Schoofs won the title after defeating Camilla Rosatello and Kimberley Zimmermann 4–6, 7–5, [10–7] in the final.

Seeds

Draw

Draw

References
Main Draw

Engie Open Andrézieux-Bouthéon 42 - Doubles